Bua or BUA may refer to:

Places 
Bua Province, Fiji
Bua (Fijian Communal Constituency, Fiji)
Bua District
Bua, Varberg Municipality, Sweden
Buinsky District (Bua Rayon) in the Republic of Tartastan, Russia
Buinsk, Republic of Tatarstan (Bua), a town in the Republic of Tatarstan, Russia

Other uses 
Built-up area
Bua language
Buryat language, ISO 639 code
Baptist University of the Américas, San Antonio, Texas, US
Boston University Academy, Massachusetts, US
British United Airways, former British airline
Buaran railway station,  Indonesia (station code)
Buka Airport, Papua New Guinea (IATA airport code)

People with the name
Ajahn Maha Bua (1913–2011), Thai Buddhist monk
Bua Thopia, Albanian monarch
Peter Bua ( 1450), Albanian leader
Theodore Bua, Albanian officer of the Republic of Venice
Kevin Bua (born 1993), Swiss footballer